IEEE Transactions on Terahertz Science and Technology is a bimonthly peer-reviewed scientific journal covering terahertz science, technology, instruments, and applications – "Expanding the use of the Electromagnetic Spectrum." The editor-in-chief is Imran Mehdi, Jet Propulsion Laboratory.

See also 
 IEEE Transactions on Microwave Theory and Techniques
 IEEE Microwave Theory and Wireless Components Letters
 IEEE Microwave Magazine
 IEEE Microwave Theory and Techniques Society

External links 
 

Transactions on Terahertz Science and Technology
Electrical and electronic engineering journals
Bimonthly journals
Publications established in 2011
English-language journals